Coassolo Torinese is a comune (municipality) in the Metropolitan City of Turin in the Italian region Piedmont, located about  northwest of Turin.

Coassolo Torinese borders the following municipalities: Locana, Corio, Monastero di Lanzo, Balangero, and Lanzo Torinese.

References

External links
 Official website

Cities and towns in Piedmont